The Eunuch of Stamboul is a 1935 spy thriller novel by the British writer Dennis Wheatley. A British army officer is forced to resign his commission to avoid a diplomatic incident. He is dispatched to Istanbul and uncovers a plot to overthrow the government of Mustafa Kemal Atatürk and restore a traditionalist sultantate, led by a eunuch who serves as a senior secret policeman in the present government.

Film adaptation
The following year it was made into a film The Secret of Stamboul, directed by Andrew Marton and starring James Mason, Valerie Hobson and Kay Walsh.

References

Bibliography
 Goble, Alan. The Complete Index to Literary Sources in Film. Walter de Gruyter, 1999.
 Reilly, John M. Twentieth Century Crime & Mystery Writers. Springer, 2015.
 Tougher, Shaun. The Eunuch in Byzantine History and Society. Routledge, 2009.

1935 British novels
Novels by Dennis Wheatley
Novels set in Istanbul
British novels adapted into films
British spy novels
British thriller novels
Hutchinson (publisher) books